This is a list of notable members of the Phi Beta Kappa Society who have Wikipedia biographies.

Notable members elected as undergraduates

Honorary members
 Mark Twain (Samuel Clemens)
 Alexander Graham Bell
 Jimmy Carter
 Calvin Coolidge
 Helen Keller
 Booker T. Washington
 Franklin D. Roosevelt
 Woodrow Wilson
 Harry S. Truman
 Barbara Bush
 Rosalynn Carter
 John Hope Franklin
 R. Buckminster Fuller
 Susan Haack
 Fred Rogers
 Rutherford B. Hayes
 David Johnston
 Mamphela Ramphele
 Eleanor Roosevelt
 Anne Sexton
 Leonard Bernstein
 John D. Rockefeller
 Ta-Nehisi Coates
 Sandra Day O'Connor
 Mary Oliver

Fictional members
Ellis Loew, fictional District Attorney in James Ellroy's novels The Black Dahlia, The Big Nowhere, and L.A. Confidential is a member of Phi Beta Kappa, and he shows his key several times.

In the movie The Thomas Crown Affair, the main character Thomas Crown toys with his golden Phi Beta Kappa key which he is wearing on a chain. It is stated that he is an alumnus of Dartmouth College and Harvard Business School.

In Desk Set (1957), Katharine Hepburn reels off all of Spencer Tracy's character's accomplishments and says that he's a graduate of M.I.T. with a Ph.D. in Science and a Phi Beta Kappa, although he doesn't wear his key, which means either that he's modest or he lost it.

Harry Bailey in It's A Wonderful Life is greeted at the train station by George and Uncle Billy as “Professor Phi Beta Kappa Harry Bailey,” implying he is a member.

In the TV show Queen Sugar, the character Charley Bordelon West is a Phi Beta Kappa member.  This is referenced when she has to correct someone who incorrectly refers to it as a social fraternity.

In the TV show Gilmore Girls Rory Gilmore is referenced as a member in Emily and Richard Gilmore's graduation musical duo.

In the TV show The Big Bang Theory, Emily Sweeney is revealed as a Phi Beta Kappa member. It is said to have been apparent on her online dating profile viewed by Rajesh Koothrappali. Also, Sheldon Cooper has a frame of Phi Beta Kappa in his office, suggesting that he is a member.

Gavin Stevens, protagonist of several pieces by William Faulkner exhibits the Phi Beta Kappa key from Harvard in the stories "Hand Upon the Water", "An Error in Chemistry" and "Knight's Gambit".

Niles Crane of the TV show Frasier is a member.

In the TV show CSI, Greg Sanders is a member.

References

Lists of members of United States student societies